Liliʻuokalani Protestant Church is a historic United Church of Christ church in Haleiwa, Hawaii on the North Shore of Oahu. Its Hawaiian food is renowned including squid lūʻau. Live music and fellowship are also served. The church celebrated its 175th anniversary in 2007. Worship services are held on Sunday morning at 10 a.m.

History
The church was founded by John Smith Emerson and his bride Ursula Sophia Newell Emerson, missionaries, in 1832 in a grass house on the corner of Kamehameha Highway and Haleiwa Road. The second building used was constructed in 1840 of adobe where the church's cemetery is now located. The third and current building was constructed in 1890 of wood and rebuilt with cement in 1961. It is a member of the United Church of Christ. It includes a clock  donated by Queen Liliʻuokalani on January 1, 1892. The clock makes one revolution every 16 years and instead of numerals it has the letters L-I-L-I-U-O-K-A-L-A-N-I.

References

Churches in Hawaii
Religious buildings and structures in Honolulu County, Hawaii
1832 establishments in Hawaii
Churches completed in 1890
Monuments and memorials to Liliʻuokalani